Swing Shift is a 1984 American romantic-drama directed by Jonathan Demme, and produced by and starring Goldie Hawn, with Kurt Russell. It also features Christine Lahti, Fred Ward, Ed Harris and Holly Hunter, in one of her earlier movie roles. The film was a box office bomb, grossing just $6.6 million against its $15 million budget. Lahti earned a nomination for the Academy Award for Best Supporting Actress.

Plot
Jack Walsh enlists as a U.S. Naval Seaman shortly after the Japanese attack at Pearl Harbor, at the start of US involvement in World War II. His wife Kay signs up to work in an armaments factory in California while he is overseas in naval service. 

Through the factory, the lonely and vulnerable Kay finally befriends her neighbor Hazel, a club singer. Months pass with Lucky, another factory worker and musician, hitting on her weekly until finally she agrees to go out with him after five months. Soon after arriving on their date, Kay spots her landlords, ducking out before they can spot her. She tells Lucky she can't as she's married, and goes home alone.

A short time later, the factory throws a party on the weekend to celebrate their success. Kay and Hazel eventually convince each other to go. At the jamboree Kay finally sees Lucky play the trumpet. This time she lets him take her home, finally falling for his charms. 

The three of them enjoy their time together until Kay's husband comes home by surprise in the summer of 1944 on a 48h secret leave. Finding them at Hazel's, Jack collects Kay to their house. 

Looking through the closet for his clothes, Jack sees the Leadman work shirt and assumes it's some man's. Kay explains she was promoted at the factory. Over dinner he bluntly confronts her, as he's realized what has occurred. The next morning Jack returns early to his ship.

Meanwhile, at the end of their shift at the factory, Lucky invites Hazel to the club. Afterwards, he takes her home and they sleep together. Kay shows up in a taxi, but upon seeing Hazel she returns home. 

Later, Hazel comes over to Kay's and they seem to have made peace. However, the three go out together and a very drunk Kay and Hazel trade insults and Lucky takes Kay home. In the morning, he tells he's going on tour with a band.

The airplane factory lets the women go once the Japanese surrender, the servicemen come home. So Kay sends Lucky a farewell letter, Jack comes back to her, and Hazel marries the club owner.

Cast

 Goldie Hawn as Kay Walsh
 Kurt Russell as Lucky Lockhart
 Christine Lahti as Hazel Zanussi
 Ed Harris as Jack Walsh
 Fred Ward as Biscuits Toohey
 Belita Moreno as Mabel Stoddard
 Holly Hunter as Jeannie
 Sudie Bond as Annie
 Patty Maloney as Laverne
 Susan Peretz as Edith
 Lisa Pelikan as Violet
 Phillip Christon as Egyptian Recruit
 Charles Napier as Moon Willis
 Alana Stewart as Frankie Parker

Production
Swing Shift has become a case study in star/producer/director conflict. Over Demme's objections, an additional 30 minutes' worth of new scenes were written and shot to emphasize Hawn's onscreen love triangle, pushing back the intended release date from Christmas 1983 and inflating the budget. There were reports that the reshoots were ordered because Christine Lahti was upstaging Hawn, but Hawn maintained that she and her producing partner Anthea Sylbert were "just trying to get the movie to work." Demme had the phrase "A Jonathan Demme Film" removed from the credits and promotional materials, and screenwriter Nancy Dowd requested to be credited under the pseudonym "Rob Morton."

Reception

Critical response
Swing Shift holds a rating of 87% on Rotten Tomatoes, based on 15 reviews.

Roger Ebert of the Chicago Sun-Times gave the film three stars out of four and wrote "There's no suspense and no big emotional payoff, but the movie is always absorbing." Gene Siskel of the Chicago Tribune awarded two-and-a-half stars out of four and wrote "Although the World War II drama does manage to work up considerable emotion for a few big moments, we also find the script wanting at as many moments. One more run through the typewriter would have helped." Vincent Canby of The New York Times wrote "Despite what seem to have been certain differences of opinion in the course of the production, 'Swing Shift' plays very smoothly. No one need be ashamed." Gary Arnold of The Washington Post wrote "Its elaborate and meticulously re-created period settings and moods prove far more interesting and diverting than the undernourished characterizations and love stories that flutter and sputter across the foregrounds." Variety found that the characters "were not people worth fighting a war for" and remarked that while "[g]reat drama, to be sure, does not depend on likeable characters...the writing and acting are too flat for the challenge." Sheila Benson of the Los Angeles Times stated "Weak, flat, mystifyingly inconsistent, the present version is understandably disownable." Pauline Kael of The New Yorker wrote "There are no high spots, no exciting moments. The picture just goes popping from one recessive, undeveloped scene to the next." Steve Jenkins of The Monthly Film Bulletin wrote "Given the pseudonymous script credit, covering the contributions of three writers, and the serious disputes between Jonathan Demme and Goldie Hawn during production, it is perhaps not surprising that Swing Shift should emerge as a disappointingly bland, muddled and inconclusive affair."

Steve Vineberg of Sight & Sound called Jonathan Demme's original cut "extraordinary – one of the best movies made by an American in the 80s." He described the story of the film as "a Hollywood tragedy. It echoes what RKO did to Orson Welles' The Magnificent Ambersons."

Awards and nominations

References

External links 
 
 
 
 
 

1984 films
1980s romantic comedy-drama films
American romantic comedy-drama films
Films scored by Patrick Williams
Films directed by Jonathan Demme
Films set in the 1940s
Films set on the home front during World War II
Films shot in California
Films with screenplays by Bo Goldman
1984 comedy films
1984 drama films
Films set in California
1980s English-language films
1980s American films